Vukajlović is a Serbian surname, derived from the Serbian male given name Vukajlo. Notable people with the surname include:

Aleksandra Vukajlović (born 1997), Serbian handball player
Dušan Vukajlović (born 1948), Serbian poet
Ljiljana Vukajlović, Serbian classical pianist
Svetlana Vukajlović (born 1960), Serbian insurance director
Vladimir Vukajlović (born 1983), Serbian footballer

Serbian surnames
Patronymic surnames
Surnames from given names